George Ball may refer to:
George H. Ball (1819–1907), American academic and founder of Keuka College in New York
George M. Ball (1832–1903), English politician and trade unionist
George Washington Ball (Iowa Democrat) (1847–1915), American lawyer and politician from Iowa
George Washington Ball (Iowa Republican) (1848–1920), American businessman and politician from Iowa
George Alexander Ball (1862–1955), American manufacturer
Sir George Joseph Ball (1885–1961), British barrister, intelligence officer, administrator, and industrialist
George Thalben-Ball (1896–1987), originally George Thomas Ball, Australian-born English composer
George Ball (diplomat) (1909–1994), American diplomat
George Ball (cricketer) (1914–1997), English cricketer
George Ball (tennis) ( 1940s–50s), American participant in the 1957 U.S. National Championships – Men's Singles
George Ball (entomologist) (1926–2019), American entomologist
George Ball (American businessman), chairman and CEO of W. Atlee Burpee

See also
Georges Ball (1838–1928), Canadian politician and lumber merchant
George Bull (disambiguation)
George Bell (disambiguation)